Miloš Milojević (born 29 September 1982) is a Serbian football coach who serves as the head coach of Red Star Belgrade. He is also a former professional player.

Playing career
As a youngster, Milojević was part of the academies of Radnički Niš and Red Star Belgrade. From his senior debut in 2000, he played in the Serbian First League and Serbian League, the domestic second and third tiers, mainly for FK Timok.

In 2006, he moved abroad for the first time in his career, signing with Icelandic club Hamar. He went on to represent 	Ægir and Víkingur, playing in the top tier Úrvalsdeild with the latter club, before retiring due to injuries in 2011.

Coaching career

Víkingur and Breiðablik
After retiring as a player, Milojević started to work as a youth coach in Iceland. In the summer of 2013, he became the assistant coach of his former club Víkingur. Together with manager Ólafur Þórðarson, he led the team to a 4th place in the 2014 Úrvalsdeild table, their best result since winning the championship in 1991. The club was knocked out in the first qualifying round of the 2015–16 Europa League through a 2–3 defeat on aggregate against Slovenian team FC Koper. On 15 July 2015, Milojevic was promoted to head coach of Víkingur, and led the club to a 9th place in the 2015 season. In 2016, Víkingur finished 7th in the table. He resigned on 19 May 2017, due to disagreements with the board, as the club was placed 10th in the table.

On 22 May 2017, just days after his departure from Víkingur, Milojević was appointed head coach of fellow Úrvalsdeild club Breiðablik, replacing Arnar Grétarsson that had been sacked by the club. He led the side to 6th place in the table, but left at the end of the year.

Mjällby AIF
On 17 November 2017, it was announced that Milojević would join Swedish club Mjällby AIF ahead of the 2018 season, as an assistant coach and head of youth development. Competing in Ettan Södra, Sweden's third tier, he took over as head coach on 18 June when Jonas Andersson stepped down due to personal reasons. The club went on to win the league through 21 wins in 30 games, twelve points clear of second placed Oskarshamns AIK in the table. On 22 November 2018, Milojevic signed a new two-year contract with the club.

In 2019, Mjällby won Superettan, Sweden's second tier, as newcomers, through 17 wins in 30 games, two points clear of Varbergs BoIS. Despite winning two promotions in just two seasons in charge of Mjällby, Milojevic left the club on 1 December 2019, after not being able to agree on new terms with their board.

Red Star Belgrade
On 19 December 2019, Milojević joined Red Star Belgrade as a first-team coach and assistant to manager Dejan Stanković. The club won the 2019–20 Serbian SuperLiga, 15 points clear of city rivals Partizan.

In 2020–21, Red Star Belgrade went unbeaten through the whole league season, winning 35 of 38 fixtures, while scoring a record-breaking 114 goals. On 25 May, the club also won the Serbian Cup through a 4–3 win on penalties (0–0 after full time) against Partizan in the final. Together with Hoffenheim, they advanced through the group stage of the 2020–21 Europa League, eliminating Slovan Liberec and Gent in the process. The club was knocked out in the round of 32 by Italian club Milan on away goals after the tie ended 3–3 on aggregate.

Hammarby IF
On 13 June 2021, Milojević was appointed new head coach of Hammarby IF in Allsvenskan, following the sacking of Stefan Billborn. He signed a contract until the end of 2024.

He led the side to the play-off round of the 2021–22 UEFA Europa Conference League, after eliminating Maribor (4–1 on aggregate) and FK Čukarički (6–4 on aggregate), where the club was knocked out by Basel on penalties (4–4 on aggregate).

On 13 December 2021, Milojević was sacked by Hammarby IF, after he had sought a move to Norwegian side Rosenborg BK and visited Trondheim without Hammarby's permission, in a deal that ultimately fell through. The club's board called his behavior "unacceptable" and stated that they had "lost all their trust" in Milojević.

Malmö FF
On 7 January 2022, Milojević was appointed new head coach of the reigning Allsvenskan champions Malmö FF, following the departure of Jon Dahl Tomasson.  Milojević was relieved of his duties on 29 July 2022, the day after Malmö FF lost in the qualifying round of the 2022-23 UEFA Champions League to Lithuanian side FK Žalgiris by an aggregate score of 3-0.

Managerial statistics 
As of 19 March 2023

Honours

Manager
Mjällby AIF
 Superettan: 2019
 Ettan: 2018
Malmö FF

 Svenska Cupen: 2021–22

References

1982 births
Living people
People from Knjaževac
Serbian footballers
Association football defenders
FK Bežanija players
Knattspyrnufélagið Víkingur players
Serbian football managers
Knattspyrnufélagið Víkingur managers
Mjällby AIF managers
Red Star Belgrade non-playing staff
Allsvenskan managers
Hammarby Fotboll managers
Malmö FF managers
Serbian expatriate footballers
Expatriate footballers in Iceland
Serbian expatriate sportspeople in Iceland
Serbian expatriate football managers
Expatriate football managers in Iceland
Expatriate football managers in Sweden
Serbian expatriate sportspeople in Sweden